The World's Most Hardest MC Project, is the fifth studio album by D-Block member and New York rapper Styles P. It was released on November 20, 2012, by D-Block and E1 Music. The album was supported by two singles, "I Know" and "Araab Styles". Producers on the album included Jahlil Beats and AraabMuzik, among others, with features including Sheek Louch, Bucky, Large Amount, A.P. and Snyp.

Background 
On August 23, 2012, Styles P released the free EP The Diamond Life Project, a collaboration with streetwear/skateboarding label Diamond Supply Co. The mixtape featured guest appearances from French Montana, Pusha T, Curren$y, Trae Tha Truth and Fred the Godson; as well as production from Jahlil Beats, The Beat Bully, Lex Luger, V Don and The Alchemist.

After the release of the EP, Styles continued work on The World's Most Hardest MC Project. 

The album features production from AraabMuzik and Jahlil Beats among other street producers with the only features coming from the D-Block family. The original release date was November 13, 2012, but it was pushed back to November 19.

Singles 
The first single entitled "I Know" was released on October 11, 2012. It is produced by Jahlil Beats. On October 22, 2012, the music video was released for "Araab Styles". "Araab Styles" was also released as the second single. On November 11, 2012, the music video was released for "I Know". On November 20, 2012, the music video was released for "Pop Out". On November 23, 2012, the music video was released for "Hoody Season".

Critical reception 

The World's Most Hardest MC Project was met with generally positive reviews from music critics. Nick De Molina of XXL gave the album an L rating, stating that the album is "a brief, hard-bodied offering from, as the title suggests, an MC who has made it his business to stay gutter in the ever-softening climate of mainstream hip-hop." The production was praised and he was called one of the most consistent artists in the game. However the album was described as sounding vaguely playful. David "Rek" Lee of HipHopDX gave the album three and a half stars out of five, saying "Overall, you won't find a highly conceptual track on here but there is enough solid material on here to make a strong case for The World's Most Hardest MC, both in the street and on the mic." David Jeffries of AllMusic gave the album three and a half stars out of five, saying "It all works, and there's a winning mix of hardcore and crossover that deserves consideration, but it all runs out too fast, coming off as a taster platter for a better, fatter, four-star Styles P album."

Track listing

Personnel 
Credits adapted from AllMusic.

A.P.P. - Featured Artist
Black Saun – Producer
Supastylez – Producer
Bucky – Featured Artist
Buda Da Future – Producer
Kristi Clifford – Management
Grandz Muzik – Producer
Vinny Idol – Producer
Jahlil Beat – Producer
Andrew Kelley – Art Direction, design
Large Amount – Featured Artist
Sheek Louch – Featured Artist
Araab Muzik – Producer
Poobs – Producer
Raafi Rivero – Photography
Raphael Rj2 – Producer
Snype – Featured Artist
Styles P – Primary Artist

Charts

References 

2012 albums
Styles P albums
Albums produced by AraabMuzik
Albums produced by Jahlil Beats